The Sargeson Prize is New Zealand's highest-endowed short-story prize. It is awarded for unpublished stories of 5000 words or less submitted by New Zealand citizens and permanent residents.  

The prize honours the legacy of Frank Sargeson, one of New Zealand’s most prolific and notable short-story writers. Along with publishing over forty short stories, plays and novels, Sargeson is noted for his support of emerging New Zealand authors. The prize continues to aid writers by offering its winner prize money and publication. The value of the first prize has gradually increased from $5,000 in its first year to $10,000 in the 2022 competition. The first prize for the secondary schools division includes a week-long writing residency at the University of Waikato.

There are two divisions to the prize. The open division is for New Zealand citizens and permanent residents over the age of 16. The secondary schools division is specifically open to New Zealand secondary school students between 16 and 18 years of age.

Founding and sponsorship
Catherine Chidgey, author and senior lecturer in writing studies at the University of Waikato, founded the Sargeson Prize in 2019 in recognition of Frank Sargeson's influence on New Zealand literature.

Sargeson took up a role as mentor to many authors who later became leading figures in New Zealand's literary scene, including the likes of Janet Frame, Maurice Duggan and John Reece Cole. Within his own stories, Sargeson was celebrated for capturing a constrained, working-class voice of New Zealand culture that had not been heard in short fiction up to that point.

The University of Waikato sponsors the Sargeson Prize, offering first, second and third prizes in open and secondary schools divisions, along with highly commended stories.

Open division
The open division takes submissions from New Zealand citizens (including those who may be based abroad) and permanent residents aged 16 and over. Entries must be single, unpublished short stories written in English. Stories should be no more than 5000 words. All three winning stories are now published in Newsroom's literary section, ReadingRoom.

Secondary schools division
The secondary schools division is open to students who are enrolled at a secondary school or homeschooling in New Zealand. They must be aged between 16 and 18 years old on the date that competition entries close. Entries must be single, unpublished stories of no more than 3000 words.

The winning story is published by Newsroom in its ReadingRoom section. The winner also receives a one-week writing residency at the University of Waikato. This opportunity secures mentoring in the School of Arts, with meals and accommodation in the halls of residence. Recipients under 18 years of age require parental approval to attend.

Winners and judges

The Frank Sargeson Memorial Lecture
Winners of the Sargeson Prize are announced annually at the Frank Sargeson Memorial Lecture, organised by Dr Sarah Shieff and hosted jointly by the University of Waikato and the Friends of Hamilton Public Library. Prominent New Zealand authors deliver the lecture, and winners of the competition are announced at the end of the proceedings. During the coronavirus lockdown restrictions of 2020 and 2021, the announcements were held online.

See also 
 Grimshaw-Sargeson Fellowship

References 

Awards established in 2019
2019 establishments in New Zealand
University of Waikato
New Zealand literary awards
Short story awards